I Will Internalize is a 2005 EP by Martha Wainwright. Released only in Canada, the EP collects several tracks from the EPs that Wainwright released prior to her full-length debut, Martha Wainwright. Track 3, "Bring Back My Heart", is Wainwright's first recorded duet with her brother, Rufus Wainwright.

Track listing

All songs written by Martha Wainwright except where noted.

References

2005 EPs
Martha Wainwright albums